Miss World 1994, the 44th edition of the Miss World pageant, was held on 19 November 1994 and marked the third consecutive staging of Miss World in Sun City, South Africa. 87 contestants from around the world competed for the title. Lisa Hanna of Jamaica crowned her successor Aishwarya Rai of India at the end of the event. 

In December 2014, Aishwarya Rai was felicitated with a Lifetime Beauty with a Purpose Award by the Miss World Organisation at the 64th Miss World contest for her humanitarian works since she won the crown.

Results

Placements

Continental Queens of Beauty

Contestants

Judges

 Eric Morley †  – Chairperson, Miss World Organization 
 Eileen Ford †  – founder, Ford Models agency 
 Ron Moss – Actor, The Bold and the Beautiful 
 Katherine Kelly Lang – Actress, The Bold and the Beautiful 
 Patrick Lichfield †  – Photographer 
 Marsha Rae Ratcliff – Entertainer and Variety Clubs Ambassador 
 Charles Dance – Actor (International Stage, Film, and Television) 
 Iman – international supermodel 
 Herb Ritts †  – Photographer 
 Zindzi Mandela-Hlongwane †  – Daughter of Nelson Mandela 
 Tony Leung Ka-fai – Actor，L'amant

Replacement
  – Yulia Alekseeva (First runner up in Miss Europe 1993) due to the Miss World Organization did not accept her as contestant.

References

External links
 Pageantopolis – Miss World 1994

Miss World
1994 in South Africa
1994 beauty pageants
Beauty pageants in South Africa
November 1994 events in Africa